Sir Charles Lemon, 2nd Baronet (3 September 1784 – 13 February 1868) was a British Member of Parliament for several constituencies and a baronet.

Early life
He inherited his baronetcy in 1824 upon the death of his father Sir William Lemon, 1st Baronet and Carclew House.  His mother was Lady Lemon, who had been the eldest daughter of James Buller MP for Cornwall and Jane, in turn eldest daughter of Allen Bathurst, 1st Earl Bathurst. He attended Harrow School

Career
Lemon served as Member of Parliament for Penryn in Cornwall from 1807 to 1812 and again from 1830 to 1831. In 1831, he became a Whig Member for Cornwall serving until the Reform Act 1832, whereafter he was Whig Member for West Cornwall until 1841. In 1842 he was again returned for West Cornwall, serving until 1857.

In 1827 he was appointed Sheriff of Cornwall. In 1836, he headed the petitioners from the town of Falmouth, Cornwall to the Admiralty, seeking to prevent the removal of the Packet Service.

In 1837, he was appointed to serve on the Transportation Committee of the House of Commons In 1852 he became deputy Warden of the Stannaries and funded the establishment of what is now the Camborne School of Mines. The name "Lemon" lives on in Truro as "Lemon Street" and "Lemon Quay", and a rhododendron Sir Charles Lemon was bred by him from seeds collected by Joseph Dalton Hooker.

He was elected as a Fellow of the Royal Society on 23 May 1822. He was the second president (1836-8) of what is now the Royal Statistical Society. He spoke at the Newcastle Meeting of the British Association in 1838, during a meeting of the Statistical Section. From 1840-1856 served as president of the Royal Geological Society of Cornwall. He was president of the Royal Cornwall Polytechnic Society from its foundation until his death. He was president of the Falmouth Board of Guardians from its foundation in 1837 until his death.

He was on the committee of management of the South Western Railway in 1836.

He was a notable Freemason in Cornwall, having been initiated into the Lodge of Love and Honour No. 75 in Falmouth in 1840, becoming its Worshipful Master in 1843, he was appointed the fifth Provincial Grand Master of the Province of Cornwall in 1844, after an interregnum of five years, following the death of his predecessor, Sir John St Aubyn, 5th Baronet, in 1839.  He held this position until he resigned in 1863.

Marriage
He married on 5 December 1810 to Lady Charlotte Ann Fox-Strangways, 4th daughter of Henry Thomas Fox-Strangways, 2nd Earl of Ilchester. They had two sons, both of whom died young and were named Charles William.
The first son died at the age of 13 months.  The second was drowned at the age of twelve, at Harrow School.
Their daughter, Charlotte Augusta Caroline died at the age of 10, in Aix-les-Bains in 1825.

Death
The baronetcy became extinct on his death on 13 February 1868, as he had no surviving children. The majority of his estate was inherited by Colonel Arthur Tremayne, Sir Charles Lemon's nephew, the son of his sister, Caroline and her husband John Hearle Tremayne, of Heligan. Tremayne was a hero of the Crimean War and a survivor of the Charge of the Light Brigade.

References

Sources

External links
 

1784 births
1868 deaths
People educated at Harrow School
Baronets in the Baronetage of Great Britain
Members of the Parliament of the United Kingdom for constituencies in Cornwall
Fellows of the Royal Society
Presidents of the Royal Statistical Society
High Sheriffs of Cornwall
Politicians from Cornwall
UK MPs 1807–1812
UK MPs 1830–1831
UK MPs 1831–1832
UK MPs 1832–1835
UK MPs 1835–1837
UK MPs 1837–1841
UK MPs 1841–1847
UK MPs 1847–1852
UK MPs 1852–1857
Presidents of the Royal Geological Society of Cornwall
Whig (British political party) MPs for English constituencies
Members of the Parliament of the United Kingdom for Penryn
Members of the Parliament of the United Kingdom for Cornwall
Committee members of the Society for the Diffusion of Useful Knowledge